Roberts Butte is a striking, flat-topped butte (2,830 m) that is very prominent in Antarctica, and can be seen from great distances standing 2 miles (3.2 km) northwest of Miller Butte in the Outback Nunataks.

It was discovered by the U.S. Victoria Land Traverse Party, 1959–60. Louis J. Roberts, United States Geological Survey (USGS) surveyor with this party, proposed the name "Flattop Mountain," but to avoid duplication the Advisory Committee on Antarctic Names (US-ACAN) named it for Roberts who was first to survey the feature.

Buttes of Antarctica
Landforms of Victoria Land
Pennell Coast